Borovikha is a rural locality (a selo) and the administrative center of Borovikhinsky Selsoviet, Pervomaysky District, Altai Krai, Russia. The population was 7,507 as of 2013. There are 59 streets.

Geography 
Borovikha is located 19 km north of Novoaltaysk (the district's administrative centre) by road. Zudilovo is the nearest rural locality.

References 

Rural localities in Pervomaysky District, Altai Krai